George Randol (1895–1973) was an actor, screenwriter, director,  and producer of films in the United States. In 1938 he was honored as an influential film executive in a newspaper writeup of the "Negro" film industry.

Randol was born in Buena Vista, Virginia.

Randol had numerous theatrical roles.

He was a partner in the short-lived Cooper-Randol Production Company of Los Angeles that delivered only Dark Manhattan. He continued on with another partnership.

He was in the Broadway production of Anna Lucasta.

Filmography

Actor 
The Exile (1931 film) as Bill Prescott
The Green Pastures (film) (1936) as High Priest
Harlem on the Prairie (1937) as Sheriff

Producer 
Dark Manhattan (1937, executive producer)
Double Deal (1939)
Midnight Shadow (1939)

Director 
''Midnight Shadow (1939)

References 

American film directors
1895 births
1973 deaths